The Bismarck Civic Auditorium on North 6th Street in Bismarck, North Dakota, was built in 1914.  It has also been known as City Auditorium and, after 1989, the Belle Mehus Civic Auditorium.  It was listed on the National Register of Historic Places in 1976.

It was a major work of Bismarck architect Arthur Wesley Van Horn (1860-1931).  Preliminary design work was done by architects Reed and Stem of St. Paul, Minnesota.

References

Theatres on the National Register of Historic Places in North Dakota
Theatres completed in 1914
1914 establishments in North Dakota
National Register of Historic Places in Bismarck, North Dakota